Fort Fetter is a neighborhood and census-designated place (CDP) in Blair County, Pennsylvania, United States. It was first listed as a CDP prior to the 2020 census.

The CDP is in central Blair County, in the north part of Blair Township. It is bordered to the north, east, and south by the borough of Hollidaysburg. U.S. Route 22 (Broad Street) runs next to the southern edge of the CDP, while the parallel Altoona–Hollidaysburg line of the Norfolk Southern Railway forms the actual CDP/borough boundary. US 22 leads east into Hollidaysburg and west  to Duncansville.

Beaverdam Branch, an east-flowing tributary of the Frankstown Branch of the Juniata River, runs through the northern part of the CDP.

Demographics

References 

Census-designated places in Blair County, Pennsylvania
Census-designated places in Pennsylvania